Wushu was contested by both men and women at the 2009 East Asian Games in taolu and sanshou disciplines from 11–13 December 2009.

Medalists 
Only the results from the taolu events have been preserved.

Men

Women

Medal table 
Taolu only.

References 

Wushu at the East Asian Games
2009 East Asian Games
2009 in wushu (sport)